St Edward's College is a Catholic school in Liverpool. It may also refer to:

 St Edward's College, East Gosford, a school in Gosford, New South Wales, Australia
 St Edward's College, Malta, a school in Vittoriosa, Malta

See also
 St. Edward's University, an institution of higher education in Austin, Texas, United States, known as St. Edward's College from 1885 to 1925